Calostreptus is a genus of giant African millipedes in family Spirostreptidae, containing three species:
 Calostreptus carinatus Attems, 1928
 Calostreptus chelys Cook, 1896
 Calostreptus cooki Kraus, 1958

References

Spirostreptida
Millipedes of Africa